Sleeping on Jupiter is a novel by Anuradha Roy. It is her third novel and was published by Hachette India on 15 April 2015. It was longlisted for the 2015 Man Booker Prize and shortlisted for the 2015 The Hindu Literary Prize. It won the 2016 DSC Prize for South Asian Literature.

Summary
Nomi Frederiksen travels to Jarmuli, a temple town in India's coastal northeast, to produce a documentary film. Nomi was born in India but was later orphaned, and sent to an ashram in Jarmuli. She was subjected to physical, emotional, and sexual abuse while at the ashram. She later escaped and was adopted, moving to Norway. She meets three old women while on a train, Gouri, Latika, and Vidya. Her production assistant, Suraj, is Vidya's son and is troubled by his ongoing divorce. The chapters alternate between Nomi's first-person narration and third person narratives following the novel's secondary characters.

Reception
Kirkus Reviews praised the first-person narration of Nomi but criticized the secondary characters for doing "nothing to move the story forward" and wrote that the novel lacked a "satisfying resolution."

Publishers Weekly wrote "the overlapping stories make for a rich and absorbing consideration of where the past ends and the present begins."

Awards and honours
 Shortlist, 2015 The Hindu Literary Prize
 Longlist, 2015 Man Booker Prize
 Winner, 2016 DSC Prize for South Asian Literature
 Shortlist, 2015 Tata Literature Live! Book of the Year Award for Fiction
 Shortlist, 2015 Atta Galatta–Bangalore Literature Festival Fiction Prize

References

2015 Indian novels
Novels by Anuradha Roy (novelist)
Hachette India books
Novels set in India
English-language novels
Novels about child sexual abuse
First-person narrative novels
Third-person narrative novels
Novels with multiple narrators
Novels set in Norway